Riverton is the name of several places:
In Australia
Riverton, South Australia, a small town and former railway junction in the mid north of South Australia
Riverton, Western Australia, a suburb of Perth, Western Australia
Electoral district of Riverton, an electorate of the Western Australian Legislative Assembly, centred on the suburb

In Canada
Riverton, Manitoba, a small village
Riverton, Nova Scotia, a small community in Pictou County

In Jamaica
Riverton City, Jamaica

In New Zealand
Riverton / Aparima, a small town at the bottom of the South Island of New Zealand

In South Africa
Riverton, a resort on the Vaal River outside Kimberley, Northern Cape

In the United States of America
Riverton, California
Riverton, Connecticut, a community in the town of Barkhamsted
Riverton Historic District (Barkhamsted, Connecticut)
Riverton, Illinois
Riverton, Indiana
Riverton, Iowa
Riverton, Kansas
Riverton, Kentucky
Riverton, Minnesota
Riverton, Missouri
Riverton, Nebraska
Riverton, New Jersey
Riverton, New York
Riverton Houses, a residential development in New York City
Riverton, Oregon
Riverton, Utah
Riverton, Washington
Riverton, West Virginia
Riverton, Wyoming

Riverton may also refer to:
Riverton Prize, a Norwegian crime fiction award

See also
 Mia Riverton
 Rivertown (disambiguation)
 Town River